Battle of Lạng Sơn may refer to:
 Lạng Sơn Campaign in 1885, a French offensive during the Sino-French War
 Battle of Lạng Sơn in September 1940, fought by French forces against the Imperial Japanese Army during the Japanese invasion of French Indochina
 Battle of Lạng Sơn (1979), during the Sino-Vietnamese War